Hamilton Square is an unincorporated community in Hamilton Township, Monroe County, Pennsylvania, United States.

References

Unincorporated communities in Monroe County, Pennsylvania
Unincorporated communities in Pennsylvania